Mataranka may refer to.

Mataranka, Northern Territory, a town and locality in Australia
Mataranka Falls, a water fall in Australia
Mataranka Hot Springs, a hot spring in Australia
Mataranka Primary School, a school – refer List of schools in the Northern Territory